Robert Horne (1510s – 1579) was an English churchman, and a leading reforming Protestant.  One of the Marian exiles, he was subsequently  bishop of Winchester from 1560 to 1580.

He was a Fellow of St. John's College, Cambridge in 1537. He was Dean of Durham from 1551 to 1553, and again from 1559 to 1560. During his time as Dean he was responsible for removing ornamentation from Durham Cathedral. He was somewhat isolated.

In exile, he was at Zurich, Frankfurt and Strasburg. He wrote additional material for a book of homilies by Jean Calvin (1553).

With Thomas Beccon, John Jewel and Edwin Sandys, he was one of the commissioners of 1559, enforcing the Injunctions of Elizabeth I of England from July of that year.

In controversy with John Feckenham, he wrote in 1566 on the issues of medieval church and state relations. He was then attacked by Thomas Stapleton, for his reliance on the history of the Papacy to be found in Bartolomeo Platina.

He was one of the Bishops' Bible translators (1568), responsible for the Book of Isaiah, Book of Jeremiah, and Book of Lamentations.

Notes

External links
 

 

1510s births
1579 deaths
People educated at Royal Grammar School, Guildford
Fellows of St John's College, Cambridge
Bishops of Winchester
Deans of Durham
16th-century Church of England bishops
Marian exiles
16th-century Protestants
English Protestants
16th-century Anglican theologians

Year of birth uncertain